Rosa Sicari is an Italian Paralympian.

She competed at the 1972 Summer Paralympics winning a gold medal in table tennis, and bronze medal, 1976 Summer Paralympics, and 1980 Summer Paralympics,  winning a bronze medal in table tennis.

See also
Paralympic sports
Sport in Italy

References 

Table tennis players at the 1972 Summer Paralympics